Enteromius chiumbeensis is a species of ray-finned fish in the genus Enteromius from the Kasai in the Democratic Republic of the Congo and the Kwango and Kwilu in Angola.

Footnotes 

 

Enteromius
Fish described in 1936
Taxa named by Jacques Pellegrin